TIM-001 was an application development microcomputer developed by Mihajlo Pupin Institute (Serbia) in 1983/84.

See also
 Mihajlo Pupin Institute

Literature
 Dragoljub Milićević, Dušan Hristović (Ed): Računari TIM, Naučna knjiga, Belgrade 1990. In Serbian.
 Dušan Hristović: Razvoj računarstva u Srbiji (Computing in Serbia), Phlogiston journal, No 18/19, pp. 89-105, Museum MNT-SANU, Belgrade 2010/2011. In Serbian.
 D.B.Vujaklija, N.Markovic (Ed): 50 Years of computing in Serbia, pp.37-44, DIS, IMP and PC-Press, Belgrade 2011.

Mihajlo Pupin Institute
Computing by computer model
IBM PC compatibles